This is the results breakdown of the local elections held in Galicia on 28 May 1995. The following tables show detailed results in the autonomous community's most populous municipalities, sorted alphabetically.

Overall

City control
The following table lists party control in the most populous municipalities, including provincial capitals (shown in bold). Gains for a party are displayed with the cell's background shaded in that party's colour.

Municipalities

A Coruña
Population: 255,087

Ferrol
Population: 85,692

Lugo
Population: 87,305

Ourense
Population: 108,547

Pontevedra
Population: 76,461

Santiago de Compostela
Population: 93,398

Vigo
Population: 288,573

References

Galicia
1995